Jakapil (meaning "shield bearer" in Puelchean) is a genus of basal thyreophoran dinosaur from the Candeleros Formation of Argentina. The type species is Jakapil kaniukura.

Discovery and naming 
The holotype, MPCA-PV-630, is a partial skeleton including several osteoderms and a complete lower jaw, which were found on land owned by the Mariluan family in 2012 and excavated between 2014 and 2019/2020. The finds were prepared by L. Pazo and J. Kaluza. The generic name, "Jakapil", is derived from "Ja-Kapïl", a Puelchean word meaning "shield bearer". This is also the literal meaning of the clade name Thyreophora. The specific name, "kaniukura", means "crest stone" in Mapudungun, in reference to its uniquely deep jaw.

Description 

Jakapil represents a novel morphotype among thyreophorans, including, among other things, the presence of a predentary bone (absent or cartilaginous in other basal thyreophorans), large, low osteoderms, and a bipedal stance, similar to Scutellosaurus.

Classification 
Due to a combination of features seen in basal ornithischians, basal thyreophorans, and ankylosaurs, a phylogenetic analysis placed it, according to most data matrices, as a basal thyreophoran, outside the clade Eurypoda. Riguetti et al. (2022) suggest that Jakapil represents a member of a previously unknown thyreophoran clade. This clade may have diverged from the rest of the thyreophorans during the Sinemurian.

The status of Jakapil as a thyreophoran has been disputed by some researchers; paleontologist Susannah Maidment of the Natural History Museum in London has instead suggested that it may be an armored, basal ceratopsian (based on jaw anatomy), or that it may even belong to an entirely distinct, previously unknown clade of ornithischians.

Paleobiology 

In light of its straight, narrow snout, Riguetti et al. (2022) suggest that Jakapil did not use its teeth and jaws to shear leaves, but instead likely processed tough plant material via mastication, as evidenced by the high amount of wear on the teeth.

Paleoenvironment 
The Candeleros Formation is interpreted as an ancient desert known as the Kokorkom desert, with some oases in it, and its fossils represent a faunal assemblage typical of Middle Cretaceous ecosystems in the western remnants of Gondwana. Other animals from this formation include the rhynchocephalians Tika and Priosphenodon, the snake Najash, the mammal Cronopio dentiacutus, the theropods Alnashetri, Buitreraptor, Ekrixinatosaurus, and Giganotosaurus, as well as the sauropods Andesaurus and Limaysaurus.

References 

Thyreophorans
Ornithischian genera
Late Cretaceous dinosaurs of South America
Cretaceous Argentina
Fossils of Argentina
Fossil taxa described in 2022